Religion in Kosovo is separated from the state. The Constitution establishes Kosovo as a secular state that is neutral in matters of religious beliefs and where everyone is equal before the law and freedom to belief, conscience and religion is guaranteed. 70.6 to 95.6% of Kosovans are Muslims. Most of them are Sunni, many of which belong to Sufi brotherhoods.

Statistics 

According to the U.S. Department of State's 2007 International Religious Freedom Report, 'the last credible census was taken in the 1980s', and the religious demographics had to be estimated. The Report found that Islam was the predominant faith in Kosovo, 'professed by most of the majority ethnic Albanian population, the Bosniak, Gorani, and Turkish communities, and some of the Roma/Ashkali/Egyptian community'. About 100,000–120,000 people were Serbs, and these were largely Serbian Orthodox. Approximately 3.4% of ethnic Albanians were Catholics, whereas Protestants comprised a minority of less than 1%, there were only two known families of Jewish origin and no reliable data for atheists. It is also likely that there are some Orthodox Albanians in Kosovo. However, with current tension between Kosovars and Serbs, they may feel as if they do not want to identify as Eastern Orthodox, as they may be thought of as ‘Serbs’ because of their Eastern Orthodox status. Therefore, they are not represented in the census. Furthermore, the report claimed that religion was 'not a significant factor in public life. Religious rhetoric was largely absent from public discourse in Muslim communities, mosque attendance was low, and public displays of conservative Islamic dress and culture were minimal.'

According to Pew Research Center's 2015 study, in 2010 Kosovo had 93.8% Muslims and 6.1% Christians; all other religious groups and the unaffiliated each had less than 1%.

According to the European Social Survey in 2012, the population of Kosovo was 88.0% Muslim, 5.8% Catholic, 2.9% Eastern Orthodox and 2.9% irreligious.

The 2011 Kosovo population census was largely boycotted by the Kosovo Serbs (who predominantly identify as Serbian Orthodox Christians), especially in North Kosovo, leaving the Serb population underrepresented. Other religious communities, including the Tarikats and Protestants, also contest the census data. Protestant leaders and those without a religious affiliation state some members of their communities were classified incorrectly as Muslims by census takers. 

The results of the 2011 census gave the following religious affiliations for the population included in the census:

Almost all Muslims in Kosovo are Sunni Muslims. The majority of Roma Muslims belong to Sufi brotherhoods, a sizeable number of practising Albanian Muslims also. 

The Serb population is largely Serbian Orthodox, and primarily concentrated in North Kosovo, though a few enclaves exist elsewhere. The Catholic Albanian communities are mostly concentrated in Gjakova, Prizren, Klina and a few villages near Peja and Vitina (see laramans). Slavic-speaking Catholics usually call themselves Janjevci or Kosovan Croats. Slavic-speaking Muslims in the south of Kosovo are known as the Gorani people.

History

Christianity 

Christianity probably reached Kosovo in the 5th century as the Roman Empire gradually split into a Greek East and Latin West. Kosovo became part the former, known as the Byzantine Empire, and thus fell into the sphere of the Eastern Orthodox Church based in Constantinople. During the High Middle Ages, as Byzantine rule in Kosovo gave way to the Serbian Empire in the early 13th century, there was a Serb-speaking Orthodox Christian majority, but also a Catholic minority consisting of the Italo-Dalmatian merchant class from Ragusa, German immigrants from Hungary and Transylvania, and probably all of the native Albanian population.

Serbian Orthodoxy 

The presence of Serbian Orthodox bishops in Lipljan and Prizren was first recorded in the 10th century. In 1219, the Serbian Orthodox Church split from the Greek Orthodox Church, and Greek bishops were expelled from Kosovo. The See of the Serbian Orthodox Church was moved from Žiča in present-day Serbia to Peja in present-day Kosovo in 1252, thus making it the religious and cultural centre of Serbian Orthodoxy. In 1346, the archbishop of Peja assumed the title of patriarch.

Catholicism and crypto-Catholics 

Kosovo was conquered by the Ottoman Empire along with the other remnants of the Serbian Empire in the period following the Battle of Kosovo (1389). Although the Ottomans did not force the Catholic and Eastern Orthodox Christian population to convert to Islam, there was strong social pressure (such as not having to pay the jizya) as well as political expediency to do so, which ethnic Albanians did in far greater numbers (including the entire nobility) than Serbs, Greeks and others in the region. Many Catholic Albanians converted to Islam in the 17th and 18th centuries, despite attempts by Catholic clergy to stop them. During the Concilium Albanicum, a meeting of Albanian bishops in 1703, a strict condemnation of conversion – especially for opportunistic reasons such as jizya evasion – was promulgated. Whilst many of these converts stayed crypto-Catholics to a certain extent, often helped by pragmatic lower clerics, the higher Catholic clergy ordered them to be denied the sacraments for their heresy. Efforts to convert the Laraman community of Letnica back to Catholicism began in 1837, but the effort was violently suppressed – the local Ottoman governor put laramans in jail. After the Ottoman Empire abolished the death penalty for apostasy from Islam by the Edict of Toleration 1844, several groups of crypto-Catholics in Prizren, Peja and Gjakova were recognised as Catholics by the Ottoman Grand Vizier in 1845. When the Laramans of Letnica asked the district governor and judge in Gjilan to recognise them as Catholics, they were refused however, and subsequently imprisoned, and then deported to Anatolia, from where they returned in November 1848 following diplomatic intervention. In 1856, a further Tanzimat reform improved the situation, and no further serious abuse was reported. The greater part of converts of Laramans, almost exclusively new-borns, took place between 1872 and 1924.

Protestantism

Islam 

After victory at the Battle of Kosovo (1389), the Ottoman Empire imposed Islamic rule on the region. Conversion was not obligatory, but had several financial, social and political benefits. Until the sixteenth century the degree of Islamisation in Kosovo was minimal, and largely confined to urban centres. The pace of conversions to Islam only increased significantly in the second half of the sixteenth century, possibly because converts thus became exempt from the cizje, a tax levied only on non-Muslims. By 1634, the majority of Kosovo Albanians had converted to Islam, although a minority remained Catholic. Besides the ethnic Albanians, and the ruling Turks who settled in Kosovo, the Roma and some part of the Slavic-speaking population (later called the Bosniaks and/or Gorani, to distinguish them from the Orthodox Serbs) also became Muslims, by far most of them Sunni, many of which belong to Sufi brotherhoods, although small a minority of Shia Muslims  formed in the countryside. By the end of the 17th century, the Islamic population started to outnumber the Christians.

See also 
 Destruction of Albanian heritage in Kosovo
 Destruction of Serbian heritage in Kosovo

References